Potatoes and Melons Wholesale Prices Straight from the Lock Up is an album of mostly cover versions performed by English punk rock band, Snuff. It was released in July 1997 on American independent label, Fat Wreck Chords.  The UK version (on the Deceptive label) is called Potatoes and Melons at Wholesale Prices Direct to You the Public and does not contain tracks 3, 4 and 6 which were already released in the UK as b-sides to the "Do Do Do" single.

Track listing
"Rivers of Babylon" (Dowe, McNaughton) – 1:37    
"Whatever Happened to the Likely Lads" (Hugg, LaFrenais) – 2:12    
"Standing in the Shadows of Love" (Holland-Dozier-Holland) – 2:09    
"Soul Limbo" (Dunn, Jackson, Jones) – 3:11    
"Come and Gone" (Redmonds) – 2:16    
"It Must Be Boring Being Snuff" (Tyler) – 1:17     
"Ye Olde Folke Twatte" (traditional) – 2:47    
"Magic Moments" (Bacharach, David) – 2:18    
"Russian Fields" (traditional) – 2:09    
"Time Dub" (Redmonds) – 0:50    
"Pink Purple" (Murphy, Redmonds) – 2:53

Credits
 Duncan – vocals, drums
 Loz – guitar
 Lee B. – bass
 Dave – trombone
 Lee M. – Hammond B-3 organ
 Produced by Snuff

External links
Fat Wreck Chords album page

1997 albums
Snuff (band) albums
Fat Wreck Chords albums